The 2018 Sport Clips Haircuts VFW 200 was a NASCAR Xfinity Series race held on September 1, 2018 at Darlington Raceway in Darlington, South Carolina. Contested over 147 laps on the  egg-shaped oval, it was the 24th race of the 2018 NASCAR Xfinity Series season.

Entry list

Practice

First practice

Final practice

Qualifying

Qualifying results

Race

Stage Results

Stage 1

Stage 2

Final Stage Results

Stage 3

References

Sport Clips Haircuts VFW 200
NASCAR races at Darlington Raceway
Sport Clips Haircuts VFW 200
2018 NASCAR Xfinity Series